Sielun Veljet was a Finnish rock band of the 1980s. They were formed soon after the disbanding of Hassisen Kone by its former frontman Ismo Alanko. Sielun Veljet never achieved the fame or the record sales figures of Hassisen Kone, but they became famous for their powerful stage presence and aggressive, shamanistic post-punk musical style. Most of the band's recorded material is sung in Finnish, except for their 1989 album Softwood Music Under Slow Pillars. They have also recorded English-language versions of their songs under the moniker L'amourder. In 2011, they released a new song, "Nukkuva hirviö" (Sleeping beast).

History

Early history 
Sielun Veljet was formed shortly after Hassisen Kone, a successful and well-known new wave band, disbanded. Singer-guitarist Alanko and guitarist Jukka Orma wanted to start making a totally different kind of music than what Hassisen Kone had done and what the Finnish public expected of them. The band was complete with bassist Jouko Hohko and drummer Alf Forsman.

The band's live performances were loud, energetic and extremely intensive from the beginning, and people soon stopped expecting another Hassisen Kone. The concerts were sometimes extremely long—one gig in Nivala in the 1980s lasted for four and a half hours and ended only when security personnel forced Alanko off the stage.

The band's self-titled debut album was recorded live in 1983. Shortly thereafter, with the 1983 EP Lapset and the 1984 album Hei soturit, the band started slowly gaining popularity. The two recordings were joined together on later releases.

Breakthrough 
L'amourha (1985) became the critical and commercial breakthrough for Sielun Veljet, and remains by far their highest selling album. "Peltirumpu" became the band's first real hit. The album and its follow-up Kuka teki huorin (1986) are considered the most accessible Sielun Veljet recordings, and remain the band's only studio album gold records. The song "On Mulla Unelma" (I have a dream) from L'Amourha album was banned by Finnish national broadcasting company, YLE, after it was performed by the band in the Härmärock television show that was broadcast on independence day. The song's lyrics blaspheme Finnish national symbols.

After Kuka teki huorin, Sielun Veljet started re-recording some of their material in English to find an audience outside Finland. They recorded an EP Ritual (1986) and the album Shit-Hot (1987) using the alias L'amourder. The name is a direct translation of the name of their most successful album – "murha" means "murder" in Finnish. A tour in Europe followed, and the band was even allowed to tour in Soviet Russia, which proved to be a success.

Suomi-Finland (1988), recorded in Finnish, saw Sielun Veljet moving into a more acoustic sound than before. The album's lyrics concentrated on the issues present in late 1980s Finland, such as the growing influence of American culture. It was followed by all-acoustic Softwood Music Under Slow Pillars (1989), written in English but not released outside Finland.

Breakup 
After the commercial failure of Softwood Music, the band decided to quit. A greatest hits collection Myytävänä! was released the same year, followed by a three-CD box set Musta laatikko in 1991. Musta laatikko included some rarely heard live and studio material, as well as a full live set under the alias Kullervo Kivi & Gehenna. A documentary film titled Veljet was also released in 1991.

In 2007, Jukka Orma mixed together some Tuomari Nurmio covers the band had recorded in 1990, some of which had been included on Musta laatikko. The album was released as Otteita Tuomari Nurmion laulukirjasta, and it reached No. 1 on the Finnish album charts, highest position ever for Sielun Veljet.

Influence 

Sielun Veljet has influenced several Finnish rock and metal bands, such as Maj Karma and Turmion Kätilöt. Turmion Kätilöt have covered the Sielun Veljet song "Volvot ulvoo kuun savuun" on their "Verta ja lihaa" single. A tribute album to them, titled Säkenöivää voimaa – tribuutti Sielun Veljille, was released in 2002 and featured among others Timo Rautiainen & Trio Niskalaukaus, Maija Vilkkumaa (who has also recorded a cover of "Peltirumpu") and Neljä Ruusua.

Discography

Studio albums

Live albums

Compilations

DVDs

Singles

References

External links 
Sielun Veljet at poko.fi
Unofficial fan page
 

Finnish alternative rock groups
Finnish post-punk music groups
Musical groups established in 1983